Bardamil or Bardmil or Bardemil may refer to:

Bardmil, Izeh, Khuzestan Province
Bardemil, Shushtar, Khuzestan Province